Nangram is a rural locality in the Western Downs Region, Queensland, Australia.

Geography 
The Condamine River flows through the locality from east (Greenswamp/Crossroads) to west (Miles/Condamine).

References 

Western Downs Region
Localities in Queensland